A rare Pepe or RarePepe is a variation on the "Pepe the Frog" internet meme, itself based on a character created by Matt Furie. The related Rare Pepe crypto project, created by various artists worldwide between 2016 and 2018, was based on the aforementioned meme and traded as non-fungible tokens (NFTs) recorded on the CounterParty platform. A total of 1,774 official cards were released for the project across 36 series.

On October 26, 2021, a rare Pepe, PEPENOPOULOS, sold at a Sotheby's auction for $3.6m USD.

Pepe the Frog 

Pepe the Frog is a cartoon green anthropomorphic frog with a humanoid body. The character originated in the 2005 Matt Furie comic Boy's Club, and became an Internet meme in 2008, popularised through Myspace, Gaia Online and 4chan. In the 2010s, the character's image was appropriated as a symbol of the alt-right movement, and by white supremacists. The Anti-Defamation League included Pepe in its hate symbol database in 2016, but said most instances of Pepe were not used in a hate-related context.

History 
In 2015, a subset of Pepe memes began to be referred to as 'rare Pepes', with watermarks such as "RARE PEPE DO NOT SAVE", generally meaning that the artist had not previously posted the meme publicly. In April 2015, a collection of rare Pepes were listed on eBay where it reached a price of $99,166 before being removed from the site.

In September 2016, the very first rare Pepes were mined in block 428919 on Bitcoin, pre-dating popular Ethereum based NFTs. A Telegram chat group dedicated to discussing the Counterparty NFT was created shortly after. By 2017, a community had grown around the digital collectables, spurring developers to build platforms for the purpose of cataloging and exchanging these unique images, thereby creating the first crypto art market in 2016.

On January 13, 2018 a live auction of rare Pepes took place in New York City, including one based on Homer Simpson which sold for $38,500, watched by representatives of the Metropolitan Museum of Art, Museum of Modern Art, and Sotheby's Institute of Art in the audience. The buyer sold it three years later for $312,000.

In March 2022, a buyer who spent $537,084 on a rare Pepe filed a lawsuit claiming fraudulent misrepresentation, alleging that only one copy was to be sold whereas 46 copies were subsequently given away, devaluing his investment.

Trading platforms 
Two components, created simultaneously, both support each other to enable interaction and asset exchange among both contributors and market participants:

 "Rare Pepe Wallet" is a web-based, encrypted wallet developed to allow users to buy, sell, and store rare Pepes using a medium of exchange called PepeCash. The backbone of the Rare Pepe Wallet is the Counterparty platform, which is built upon the bitcoin network.

 "Rare Pepe Directory" was a directory built to catalog all known rare Pepes, with specific guidelines for submitting the images for inclusion. The Rare Pepe Foundation removed any offensive images that were submitted before they became visible.

Crypto artists used these resources to publish their work as digital tokens with a fixed circulation and then issued the art to collectors who then sold, traded, or stored their collections.

Collectors use the 'Rare Pepe Blockchain Trading' channel on the Telegram instant messaging platform to discuss with other collectors.

See also
 CryptoKitties
 CryptoPunks
 Bored Ape
 EtherRock
 List of most expensive non-fungible tokens
 Meme coin
 Trading card#Digital trading cards

References

External links 
 Rare Pepe Directory
 Rare Pepe Wallet

Non-fungible token
2010s in Internet culture
Frogs in art